Lucerapex indagatoris is a species of sea snail, a marine gastropod mollusk in the family Turridae, the turrids.

Description
The length of the shell attains 44 mm.

Distribution
This marine species occurs off Southern India and off Réunion

References

 Finlay, H. J. (1927). New specific names for Austral Mollusca. Transactions of the New Zealand Institute. 57: 488–533.

External links
 Gastropods.com: Lucerapex indagatoris
 Smith, E. A. (1899). Natural history notes from H.M. Indian Marine Survey Steamer 'Investigator', commander T.H. Heming, R.N. Series III., No. 1. On Mollusca from the Bay of Bengal and the Arabian Sea. Annals and Magazine of Natural History. (7)4, 237-251
 A.W.B. Powell, The family Turridae in the Indo-Pacific. Part 1. The subfamily Turrinae; Indo-Pacific mollusca. vol. 1 Pages: 227--346

indagatoris
Gastropods described in 1927